Roland is a census-designated place in Pulaski County, Arkansas, United States. It is part of the Central Arkansas metropolitan area. Per the 2020 census, the population was 820.

Currently it is in the Pulaski County Special School District and is zoned to Joe T. Robinson Elementary School, Joe T. Robinson Middle School, and Joe T. Robinson High School.

Demographics

2020 census

Note: the US Census treats Hispanic/Latino as an ethnic category. This table excludes Latinos from the racial categories and assigns them to a separate category. Hispanics/Latinos can be of any race.

References

Census-designated places in Pulaski County, Arkansas
Census-designated places in Arkansas
Census-designated places in Little Rock–North Little Rock–Conway metropolitan area